Hollywood Hills West is a neighborhood of the City of Los Angeles, located at the heart of the west side neighborhoods of the city. Although it is similar in appellation, Hollywood Hills West and the City of West Hollywood have no connection.  Central Los Angeles, California. There are three city parks and one elementary school.

Geography
Hollywood Hills West is surrounded by the neighborhoods of Hollywood Hills, on the north,  Hollywood, on the south, Nichols Canyon, on the east and Laurel Canyon, on the west. The neighborhood is bisected by Laurel Canyon Boulevard and is bordered on the east by Outpost Drive and on the south by an irregular line that includes Franklin Avenue, Fairfax Avenue and Sunset Boulevard, or the West Hollywood city limits. On the west the neighborhood ends at the Beverly Hills city line (Trousdale Estates, and on the north it stops at Mulholland Drive.

The area includes the neighborhoods of Crescent Heights, Laurel Canyon, Lookout Mountain, Mount Olympus, Sunset Plaza, and Nichols Canyon.

Demographics
A total of 14,860 people lived in the neighborhood's 4.87 square miles, according to the 2000 U.S. census—averaging 3,048 people per square mile, among the lowest population densities in the city. The population was estimated at 16,003 in 2008. The median age for residents was 41, considered old for the city and the county as a whole. The percentages of residents aged 35 and above are among the county's highest.

The neighborhood is "not particularly diverse," the diversity index being 0.273, and the percentage of white people is considered high, at 84.9%. Latinos make up 5.8%, Asians are at 3.9%, blacks at 2.7% and others also at 2.7%. In 2000 the United Kingdom (10.3%) and Ukraine (7.2%) were the most common places of birth for the 25.4% of the residents who were born abroad, considered an average percentage of foreign-born when compared with the city or county as a whole.

The median household income in 2008 dollars was $108,199, considered high for both the city and county. The percentage of households earning $125,000 or more was high, compared to the city and the county at large. The average household size of 1.9 people was relatively low. Homeowners occupied 63.6% of the housing units, and renters occupied the rest.

In 2000 there were 178 families headed by single parents, or 5.8%, a rate that was low in both the county and the city. The percentages of never-married men (51%) and divorced men (8.8%) were among the county's highest. A high number of the residents were military veterans—8.4% of the population, the percentage who served during World War II or the Korean War being among the county's highest.

Education
Hollywood Hills West residents aged 25 and older holding a four-year degree amounted to 58.8% of the population in 2000, considered high when compared with the city and the county as a whole, as were the percentages of residents with a bachelor's or a postgraduate degree

There is just one school within the neighborhood's boundaries: Wonderland Avenue Elementary School, operated by the Los Angeles Unified School District at 8510 Wonderland Avenue.

Recreation and parks
The neighborhood is home to three City of Los Angeles recreation facilities—Laurel Canyon Park, Wattles Garden Park and Runyon Canyon Park.

References

External links
  Hollywood Hills West Neighborhood Council
  Comments about living in Hollywood Hills West
  Hollywood Hills West crime map and statistics

Neighborhoods in Los Angeles
Populated places in the Santa Monica Mountains
Laurel Canyon, Los Angeles
Central Los Angeles